Stuart Buchanan (March 18, 1894 – February 4, 1974) was an American voice actor, announcer, radio and TV producer, and educator. He is known for his work at The Walt Disney Company as a casting director and voicing The Huntsman in the animated film Snow White and the Seven Dwarfs (1937) and voicing Goofy in The Mickey Mouse Theater of the Air  (1938). He is also known for producing the Ohio Story radio and TV series (1953-1961). In its time, the series held the record for the longest-running regional scripted program in the nation.

Early Years
Born Paul Stuart Buchanan in Eldora, Iowa. His father, the late Rev. Edgar L. Buchanan, was a Presbyterian minister in Wooster, Ohio. Buchanan graduated from the College of Wooster and received a doctorate from Harvard University and he served as a U.S. Army officer for two years in World War I (1917-1919).

In the early years of his career, he taught poetry and drama at the University of Florida and West Virginia University. During those tenures, he also directed Little Theatre productions. While he taught at the University of Florida, Buchanan helped to launch the school's radio station.

Hollywood Years
In May 1930, Buchanan became program director at radio station KHJ in Los Angeles. He directed episodes of the radio programs Hollywood Hotel and Lux Radio Theatre. He also worked for ABC radio as program supervisor and as head of the script department. On stage, he toured in a production of Mister Antonio, acted in summer stock theatre in Denver, and acted and directed at the Pasadena Playhouse.

Buchanan was a dialogue and casting director at the Disney studios. For a time, he was in charge of all foreign versions of Disney productions. He is known for voicing The Huntsman in the 1937 Disney animated film Snow White and the Seven Dwarfs. He had roles  in Saludos Amigos (1942) and Super-Speed (1935). He was the voice of  Goofy in Moose Hunters (1937) and The Mickey Mouse Theater of the Air(1938).

In the 1940s Buchanan was head of the script department and program supervision for American Broadcasting Company in New York before taking a job directing the radio and television department of the McCann-Erickson advertising agency in 1947.

The Ohio Story Radio & TV Series

Frank Siedel, series scriptwriter, Anson Hardman, Head of the Advertising and General Information Department at Ohio Bell Telephone Company, and Buchanan, series radio and TV producer, are credited with creating The Ohio Story series. The series ran from 1947 to 1955 on radio and from 1953 to 1961 on TV.

Buchanan picked Robert Waldrop to narrate the radio series, and he convinced Hollywood actor Nelson Olmsted to commute to Cleveland to narrate and act in the Ohio Story TV episodes and the final two years of the Ohio Story radio series. He chose Ray Culley of Cinécraft Productions, a Cleveland-based sponsored film studio, to direct the 175 episodes of the TV series. Approximately 1,300 radio and 175 Ohio Story TV episodes were produced.

In a interview with Todd Raper, A TV and Radio reporter with the Columbus (Ohio) Dispatch Buchanan said: "There has never been – or will be, a radio series that commanded the respect and attention of this state, or, for that fact, the nation. The "Ohio Story" reached its peak in the heyday of radio - the late 1940s. Only one show in the nation had a higher rating - that was the Jack Benny show. I guess of all the things I've done in my lifetime, I'm most proud to have had a hand in developing and producing "The Ohio Story."

Personal life
Buchanan was married to Anna Hall Hilditch and later to Rita Whearty. Buchanan died on February 4, 1974, in Shaker Heights, Ohio, at the age of 79 and was buried in Wooster, Ohio. His wife, Rita, three sons and two daughters survived him.

Filmography
{| class="wikitable"
|-
! Year
! Title
! Role
! Notes
|-
|1935|| Super-Speed || Announcer || Disney, Voice, Uncredited
|-
|1937|| Moose Hunters || Goofy (some lines) || Disney short film, Voice, Uncredited
|-
|1937|| Snow White and the Seven Dwarfs|| The Huntsman || Disney, Voice, Uncredited
|-
|1938|| The Mickey Mouse Theater of the Air || Goofy || Disney, Voice, Radio show
|-
|1940|| Pinocchio || Carnival Barker || Disney, Voice, Uncredited
|-
|1943|| Saludos Amigos || Flight Attendant || Disney,  Voice, Uncredited
|-
|1947-1955|| Ohio Story Radio Series || Producer ||  Credited. Approximately 1,300 episodes
|-
|1953-1961|| Ohio Story Television Series || Producer ||  Credited. Approximately 175 filmed episodes
|}

References

External links

 Buchanan, Paul Stuart. Encyclopedia of Cleveland History. History Department. Case Western Reserve University https://case.edu/ech/articles/b/buchanan-paul-stuart
 Caton, Evalena H. A Critical Analysis of The Ohio Story, M.A. Thesis Ohio State University, 1949 https://library.ohio-state.edu/search/o13517261
 Celebration of the Ohio Storys tenth anniversary. This and other Ohio Story'' filmed TV episodes and scripts may be found in the Hagley Museum and Library digital archives.   https://digital.hagley.org/FILM_2019227_FC447

1894 births
1974 deaths
20th-century American male actors
American male voice actors
College of Wooster alumni
University of Florida faculty
West Virginia University faculty
Harvard University alumni